One in a Million is an album released by Big Country in 2001.  It had been recorded live in various venues between 1993 and 1995.

Track listing
"One in a Million" (5:20)
"Long Way Home" (4:47)
"King of Emotion" (3:46)
"All Go Together" (3:15)
"Post Nuclear Talking Blues" (3:01)
"You Dreamer" (4:09)
"I'm Not Ashamed" (3:45)
"Peace in Our Time" (3:01)
"Just a Shadow" (3:05)
"Thirteen Valleys" (4:44)
"The Storm" (4:25)
"Magic in Your Eyes" (2:58)
"In a Big Country" (3:34)
"Daystar" (5:42)
"I'm on This Train" (5:08)
"Ships" (3:28)
"We're Not in Kansas" (5:23)

Big Country albums
2001 compilation albums